Lewis is an unincorporated census-designated place in the town of Clam Falls, Polk County, Wisconsin, United States. As of the 2010 census, its population is 164.

History
The town is named for founder Charles E. Lewis, a Minnesota wheat broker who purchased a large tract of land in Clam Falls Township around the turn of the 20th century.  His personal estate, "Seven Pines Lodge", attracted several prominent guests throughout the 1920s, including President Calvin Coolidge, and is maintained as a private resort complex to this day.  Knapp Creek, the abutting stream once referred to as "[a] trout preserve which is second to none in this country", continues to be classified as a Class I trout stream. However, much of the stream runs through private property and is not accessible as a public fishery.  Like many in the area, the town has seen steady decline in population and economic base since the demise of the logging and railroad industries.

References

Census-designated places in Polk County, Wisconsin
Census-designated places in Wisconsin